Helsmoortel-Van der Aa syndrome, also known as ADNP syndrome, is a noninherited genetic condition caused by mutations in the activity-dependent neuroprotector homeobox (ADNP) gene. This condition is rare with <100 cases described up to 2018.

Signs and symptoms

These are variable and include autism spectrum disorders, intellectual disability, dysmorphic features and hypotonia.

Genetics

This condition is caused by mutations in the ADNP gene. This gene is located on the long arm of chromosome 20 (20q13.13).

ADNP has been associated with abnormalities in the autophagy pathway in schizophrenia.

Pathogenesis

The ANDP gene is involved in the autophagy pathway. Its precise role in this process is under active investigation.

Diagnosis

This is made by sequencing the ADNP gene.

Treatment

Treatment is symptomatic. This may include speech, occupational, and physical therapy and specialized learning programs depending on individual needs.

Treatment of neuropsychiatric features may also be needed.Nutritional support is sometimes needed. Treatment of the ophthalmologic and cardiac finding that may co-exist is also indicated.

A small study by researchers at the Seaver Autism Center for Research and Treatment at Mount Sinai Hospital suggests that low-dose ketamine may be effective in treating clinical symptoms in children diagnosed with ADNP syndrome (also known as Helsmoortel-VanDerAa syndrome).

History

The gene was first cloned in 1998, and the syndrome was first described in 2014. The syndrome was discussed in 2021 at LSU OMFS Baton Rouge case conference.

References 

Genetic diseases and disorders
Rare syndromes
Autosomal dominant disorders